The Federal Capital women's cricket team is the women's representative cricket team for the Islamabad Capital Territory. They competed in the Women's Cricket Challenge Trophy in 2011–12 and 2012–13.

History
Federal Capital competed in the Twenty20 Women's Cricket Challenge Trophy in its first two seasons, in 2011–12 and 2012–13. They finished second in their group in both seasons, winning one match and losing one match in both tournaments.

Players

Notable players
Players who played for Federal Capital and played internationally are listed below, in order of first international appearance (given in brackets):

 Naila Nazir (2009)
 Sidra Nawaz (2014)
 Aliya Riaz (2014)
 Diana Baig (2015)
 Fareeha Mehmood (2018)

Seasons

Women's Cricket Challenge Trophy

See also
 Islamabad women's cricket team
 Federal Areas cricket team

References

Women's cricket teams in Pakistan
Cricket in Islamabad